Muradlı may refer to:

 Mahammad Muradli, 2015 World Youth Chess Champion from Azerbaijan
 Muradlı, Agsu, a village and municipality in the Agsu Rayon of Azerbaijan
 Moradlu District, a district in Meshgin Shahr County, Ardabil Province, Iran
 Haçıalmuradlı, a village and municipality in the Imishli Rayon of Azerbaijan